The 2006 Dutch Figure Skating Championships took place between 16 and 18 December 2005 in 's-Hertogenbosch. Skaters competed in the disciplines of men's singles, ladies' singles, and ice dancing.

Senior results

Men

Ladies

Ice dancing

External links
 results

Dutch Figure Skating Championships
2005 in figure skating
Dutch Figure Skating Championships, 2006
2006 in Dutch sport